= Rue de la Liberté =

Thoroughfare in Dijon, France

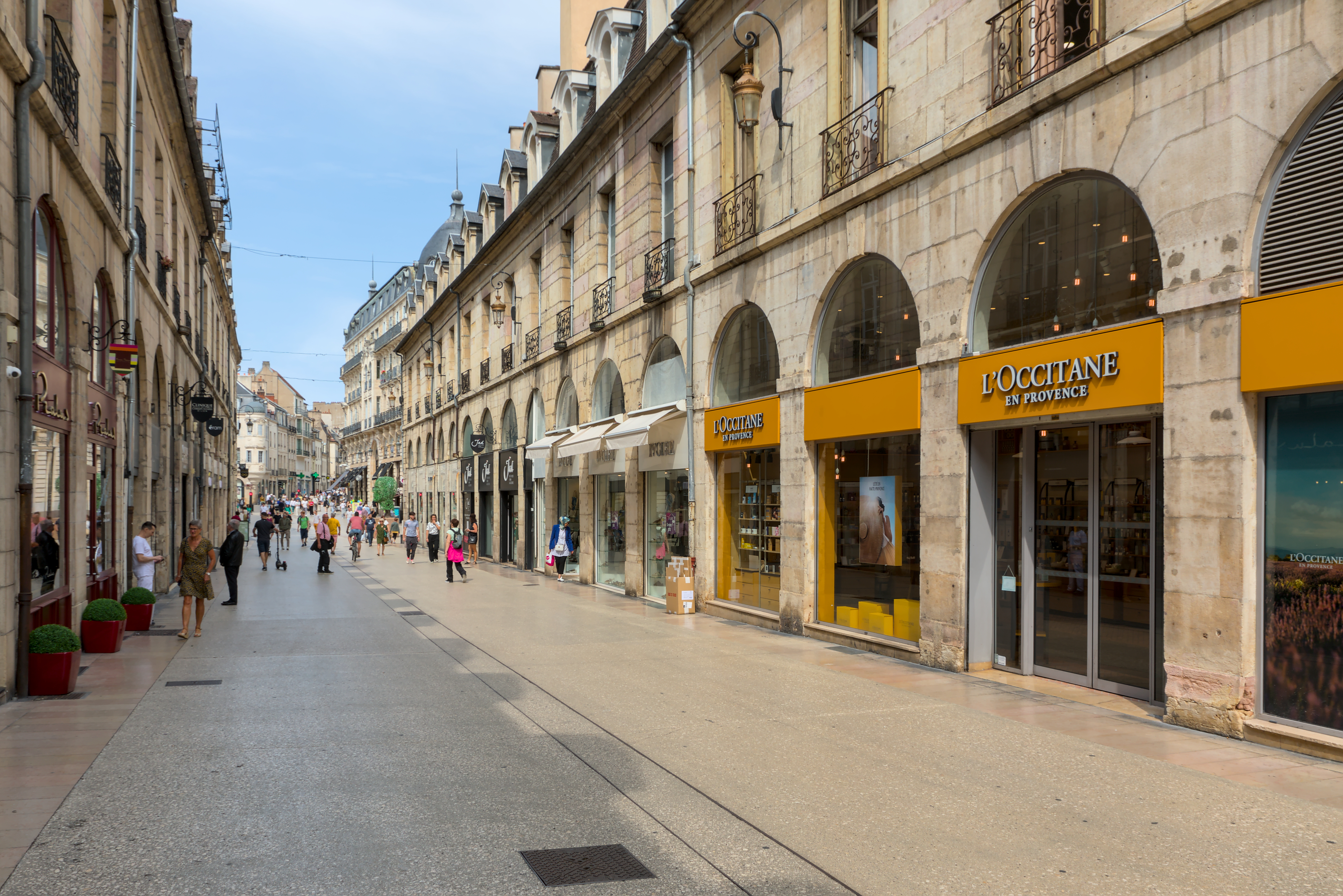
- Eastern part of rue de la Liberté
- Interactive map of Rue de la Liberté
- Former name: Rue de Condé
- Type: Street
- Length: 500 m
- Location: Dijon, Côte-d'Or, France
- Postal code: 21000
- Coordinates: 47.323134°N 5.043793°E

The Rue de la Liberté is the main street in the historic center of the French city Dijon. It connects the Place Darcy to the Place de la Libération. This busy shopping street for pedestrians is lined with buildings mostly dating from the 15th century to the 18th century, which are classified as monuments historiques.

== History ==
The Rue de la Liberté was named Rue de Condé before the French Revolution. A part of the street, from the Coin du Miroir to the Place d'Armes (now Place de la Libération), was drilled in 1724. Previously, the street included the Rue des Forges and reached the back of the Palais des Ducs. The name "Coin du Miroir" is linked to a hotel in the old Rue Saint-Jean at the corner of the streets Guillaume and Gondrans and which belonged to the Abbaye Notre-Dame du Miroir. This hotel, composed of a square tower which displays on its first floor large ogival openings in the wall, crenellated and surrounded by ditches, was demolished in 1767.

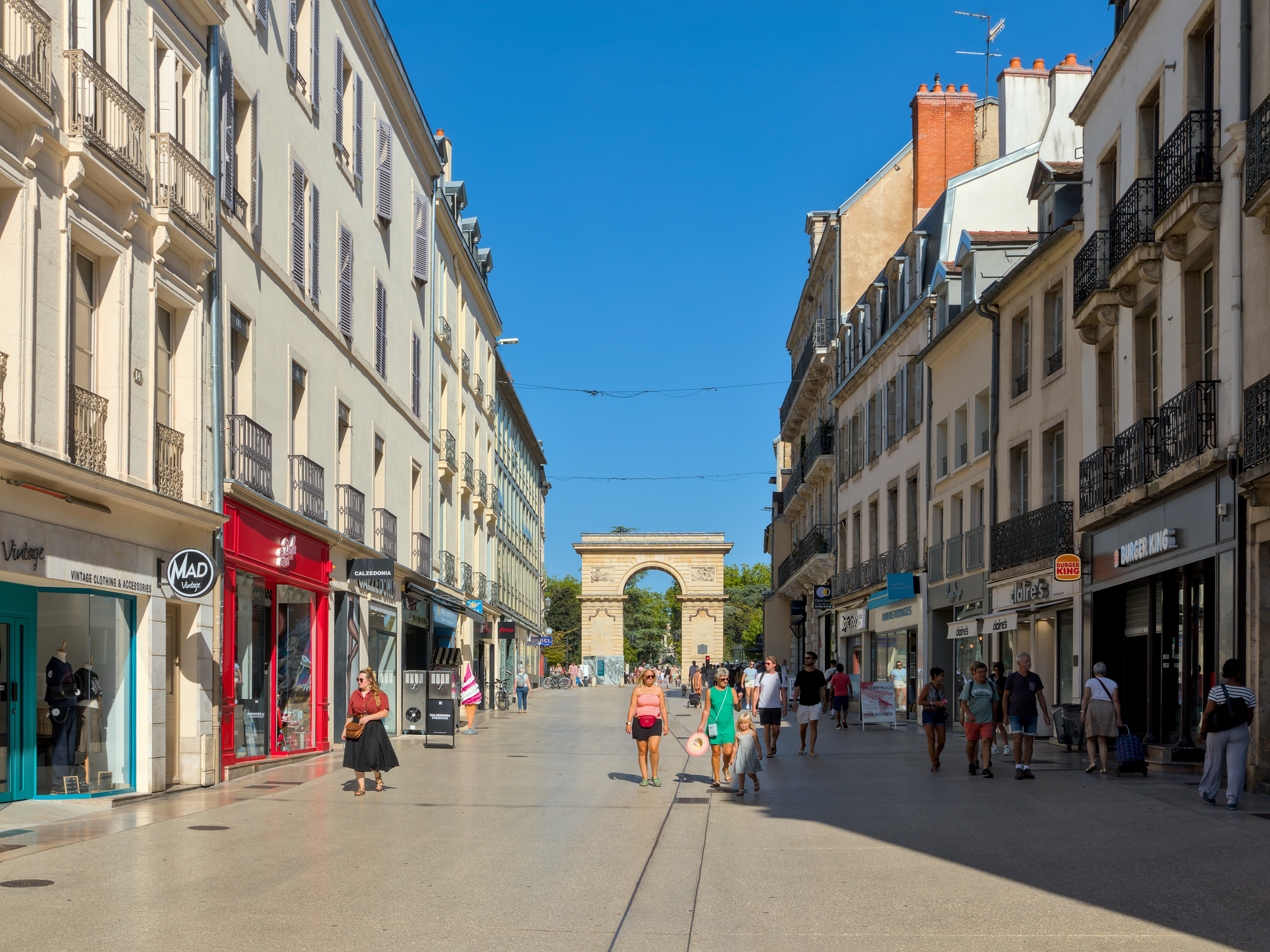
Western end of the street

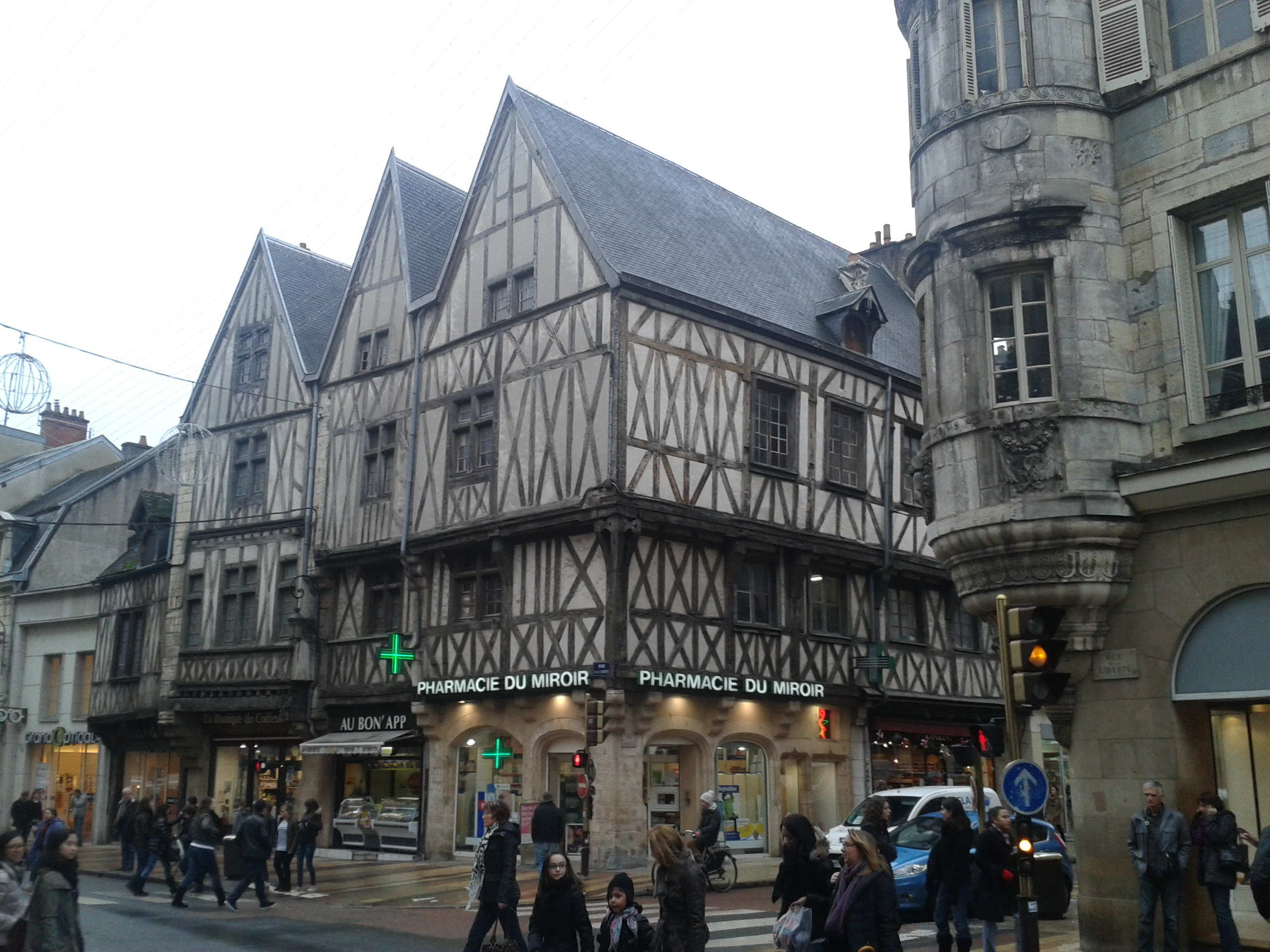
The Maison aux Trois Visages at the Coin du Miroir, built around 1470

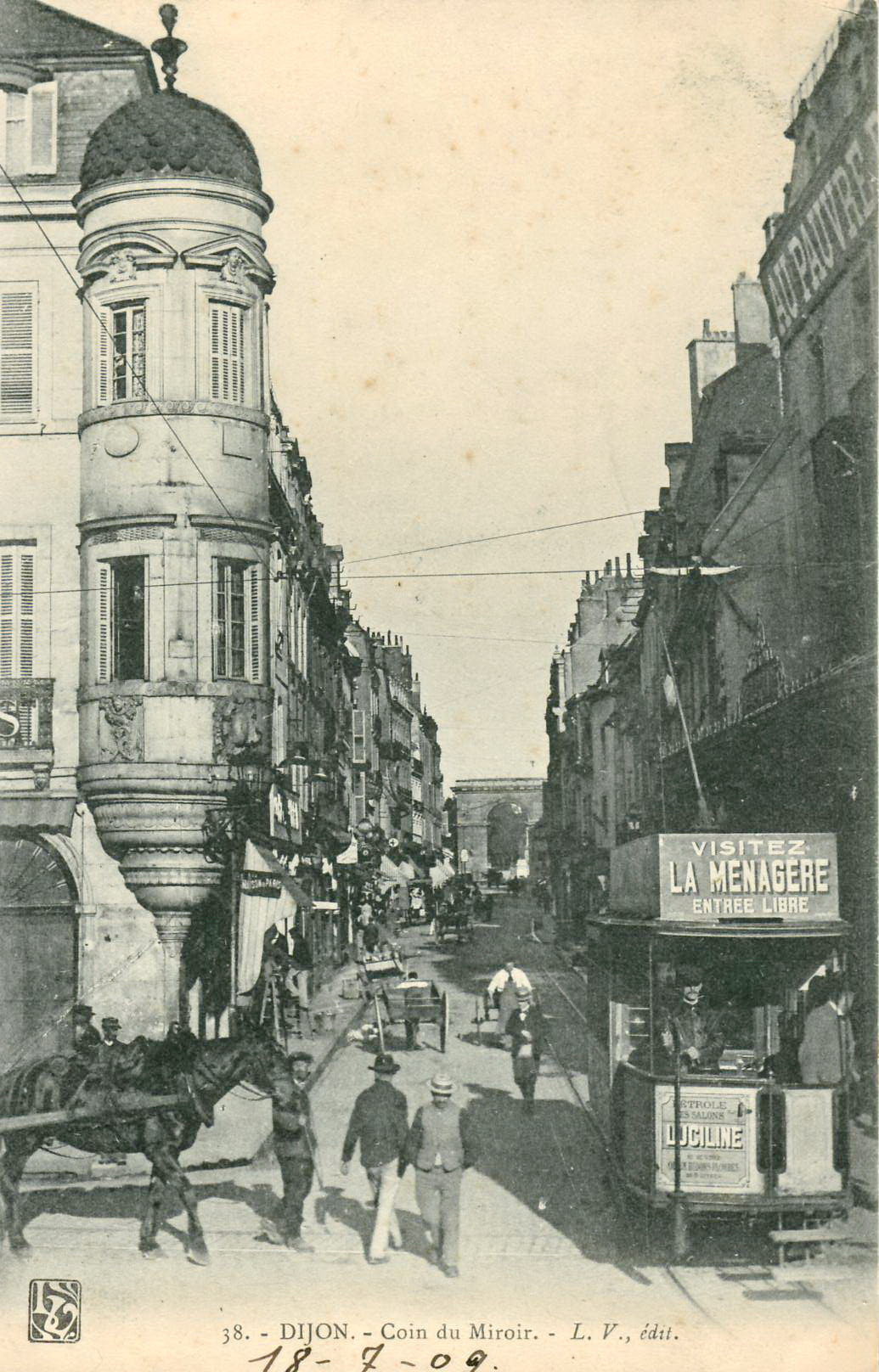
The Coin du Miroir in the 1910s
